Kahama is a town in north-western Tanzania. The town serves as the headquarters of Kahama Urban District.

Geography

Population
As of January 2006, the population of Kahama was estimated at 36,000.

Places of interest
The following nine placed of interest are in or near the town:

 Headquarters of Kahama District Administration
 Offices of Kahama Town Council
 Kahama Central Market
 Buzwagi Gold Mine
 Kahama Mining Corporation Limited - an underground gold mine operated by Barrick Gold, a Canadian mining company
 Kahama General Hospital
 Kahama Airstrip
 Dodoma-Bukoba highway

References

Populated places in Shinyanga Region
Cities in the Great Rift Valley